Mönchengladbach is an electoral constituency (German: Wahlkreis) represented in the Bundestag. It elects one member via first-past-the-post voting. Under the current constituency numbering system, it is designated as constituency 109. It is located in western North Rhine-Westphalia, comprising the city of Mönchengladbach.

Mönchengladbach was created for the inaugural 1949 federal election. Since 2002, it has been represented by Günter Krings of the Christian Democratic Union (CDU).

Geography
Mönchengladbach is located in western North Rhine-Westphalia. As of the 2021 federal election, it is coterminous with the independent city of Mönchengladbach.

History
Mönchengladbach was created in 1949, then known as Rheydt – M.Gladbach – Viersen. It acquired its current name in the 1965 election. In the 1949 election, it was North Rhine-Westphalia constituency 23 in the numbering system. From 1953 through 1961, it was number 82. From 1965 through 1976, it was number 79. From 1980 through 1998, it was number 78. From 2002 through 2009, it was number 110. Since 2013, it has been number 109.

Originally, the constituency comprised the independent cities of Rheydt, Mönchengladbach, and Viersen. From 1965 through 1976, it comprised the independent cities of Mönchengladbach and Viersen. It acquired its current borders in the 1980 election.

Members
The constituency has been held by the Christian Democratic Union (CDU) during all but one Bundestag term since 1949. It was first represented by Hans Schmitz from 1949 to 1953, followed by Joseph Illerhaus from 1951 to 1969. Curt Becker served from 1969 to 1976, Wolfgang Feinendegen from 1976 to 1983, and Hans-Wilhelm Pesch from 1983 to 1998. Hildegard Wester of the Social Democratic Party (SPD) won the constituency in 1998 and served a single term. Günter Krings regained it for the CDU in 2002 and was re-elected in 2005, 2009, 2013, 2017, and 2021.

Election results

2021 election

2017 election

2013 election

2009 election

References

Federal electoral districts in North Rhine-Westphalia
1949 establishments in West Germany
Constituencies established in 1949
Mönchengladbach